Olivier Strebelle (20 January 1927 – 29 July 2017) was a Belgian sculptor.

Strebelle was born in Brussels, Belgium on 20 January 1927.
His monumental (usually bronze) sculptures adorn many public places in Brussels as well as in Germany, Israel, Italy, Russia, Singapore, Switzerland, and the United States.

Strebelle was a prolific artist for more than 65 years, and his works are found in private collections and public settings around the world. His style has evolved from robust, organic abstract forms to the sinuous lines seen in Athletes' Alley, on the site of the Beijing Olympic Games.

His sculpture The Abduction of Europa has been on display in the Square of Europe, Moscow since September 2002.

Athletes Alley

Athletes Alley is a sculpture meant as a gift from Belgium to the city of Beijing, but was not completed in time. It opened shortly after the games ended, having cost over 5 million euros.

The abstract installation is composed of 5 tubular polished stainless steel modules that reach up to 20m height and 100m length (weighing 120T), and is meant to evoke the Olympic rings.

The production of Athletes Alley involved a technological collaboration between the image laboratory of Université Libre de Bruxelles, Tsinghua University, a French engineering consultancy specialising in metallic frame-works (C&E Ingénierie) and a German software company, Sofistik.

Gallery

References

External links

Official website
  Athletes Alley (Official website)

1927 births
2017 deaths
2008 Summer Olympics
Belgian culture
Belgian sculptors
Buildings and structures in Beijing
People from Uccle
Prix de Rome (Belgium) winners